The Frankfurter Opern- und Museumsorchester (Frankfurt Opera House and Museum's Orchestra) is the resident orchestra of the Oper Frankfurt. Its somewhat peculiar name is derived from the series of "Museum Concerts", organized by the Frankfurter Museumsgesellschaft since 1808. The orchestra is ranked as an "A-list" ensemble under the German TVK regulations. Its music director and principal conductor is Sebastian Weigle.

History and repertory 
With a history spanning more than 200 years, the Frankfurter Opern- und Museumsorchester is one of Germany's oldest symphonic ensembles. It was founded in the late 18th century as the orchestra of the Oper Frankfurt, Frankfurt's municipal opera. In addition to playing in the opera house, the orchestra maintains a series of 10 subscription programs per season (each played twice, on Sundays 11 a.m. and Mondays 8 p.m. CET, respectively), performed at the Alte Oper Frankfurt, a former opera house converted into a concert hall.

The orchestra has attracted leading conductors and musicians since its founding. Composer-violinist Louis Spohr was the second principal conductor (1817–1819) of the Museumsorchester; his successors included Clemens Krauss, William Steinberg, Franz Konwitschny, Georg Solti, Christoph von Dohnányi, and Michael Gielen.

Other notable conductors and composers who led the orchestra have included Gustav Mahler, Richard Strauss, Arthur Nikisch, Hans Pfitzner, Willem Mengelberg, Wilhelm Furtwängler, Hans Knappertsbusch, Hermann Abendroth, Bruno Walter, and George Szell. The orchestra has played the premieres of several operas.

Richard Strauss' large-scale tone-poems Ein Heldenleben and Also sprach Zarathustra were both premiered by the Frankfurter Opern- und Museumsorchester.

Many leading soloists have appeared with the orchestra, beginning with Johannes Brahms and Clara Schumann in the 19th century. From 1915 to 1923, composer-violist Paul Hindemith served as concertmaster of the Opern- and Museumsorchester. Its repertoire includes major operatic and symphonic works from Baroque to contemporary music.

In the 2005/2006 and 2006/2007 seasons, the Museumsorchester was voted one of the three top German opera orchestras in the country, selected by the leading operatic magazines in Germany. For the 2007/2008 season, the noted German periodical Die Deutsche Bühne voted the Oper Frankfurt the best opera house in Germany. Finally, in 2009, the respected music-industry magazine Opernwelt voted the Opern- und Museumsorchester Orchestra of the Year among all the German opera- and theatre orchestras, an honour the orchestra shares with the Bayerisches Staatsorchester; in both 2010 and 2011 the orchestra was again named "Orchestra of the Year".

Music Directors and Principal Conductors

 1817 – 1819: Louis Spohr
 1821 – 1848: Carl Guhr
 1848 – 1860: Franz Messer
 1860 – 1891: Carl Müller
 1880 – 1892: Felix Otto Dessoff
 1893 – 1924: Ludwig Rottenberg
 1924 – 1929: Clemens Krauss
 1929 – 1933: Hans Wilhelm Steinberg (aka: William Steinberg)
 1933 – 1934: Bertil Wetzelsberger
 1935 – 1936: Karl Maria Zwißler
 1937 – 1938: Georg Ludwig Jochum
 1938 – 1944: Franz Konwitschny
 1945 – 1951: Bruno Vondenhoff
 1952 – 1961: Georg Solti
 1961 – 1966: Lovro von Matačić
 1966 – 1968: Theodore Bloomfield
 1968 – 1977: Christoph von Dohnányi
 1977 – 1987: Michael Gielen
 1987 – 1991: Gary Bertini
 1991 – 1992: Hans Drewanz
 1992 – 1997: Sylvain Cambreling
 1997 – 1999: Klauspeter Seibel
 1999 – 2008: Paolo Carignani
 2008 – Sebastian Weigle

Orchestra Members (2009–2010 season)
Source:

Violins I Ingo de Haas | Dimiter Ivanov | Gesine Kalbhenn-Rzepka | Karin Boerries | Andreas Martin | Vladislav Brunner | Susanne Callenberg-Bissinger | Arvi Rebassoo | Sergio Katz | Hartmut Krause | Basma Abdel-Rahim | Kristin Reisbach | Karen von Trotha | Dorothee Plum | Christine Schwarzmayr | Freya Ritts-Kirby | Juliane Strienz | Almut Frenzel-Riehl | Jefimija Brajovic | Gisela Müller | Beatrice Kohllöffel | Tamara Okolowska | Nemanja Bugarcic

Violins II Guntrun Hausmann | Sebastian Deutscher | Sabine Scheffel | Olga Yukhananova | Lutz ter Voert | Theo Herrmann | Antonin Svoboda | Kyong Sil Kim | Wolfgang Schmidt | Doris Drehwald | Lin Ye | Susanna Laubstein | Donata Wilken | Frank Plieninger | Nobuko Yamaguchi | Regine Schmitt | Marina Sarkysian | Alexandra Wiedner

Violas Thomas Rössel | Philipp Nickel | Wiebke Heidemeier | Ludwig Hampe | Martin Lauer | Dieter Mock | Philipp Hufnagel | Robert Majoros | Miyuki Saito | Jean-Marc Vogt | Mathias Bild | Fred Günther | Ulla Hirsch | Susanne Hefele

Violoncellos Daniel-Robert Graf | Rüdiger Clauß | Sabine Krams | Kaamel Salah-Eldin | Johannes Oesterlee | Philipp Bosbach | Horst Schönwälder | Louise Giedraitis | Corinna Schmitz | Florian Fischer | Roland Horn

Doubles Basses Ichiro Noda | Bruno Suys | Hedwig Matros-Büsing | Akihiro Adachi | Choul-Won Pyun | Ulrich Goltz | Matthias Kuckuk | Philipp Enger | Heinrich Lademann | Hans Uhlmann

Flutes Paul Dahme | Sarah Louvion | Anne-Cathérine Heinzmann | Rolf Bissinger |Almuth Turré | Rüdiger Jacobsen

Oboes Nick Deutsch | Giorgi Gvantseladze | Márta Malomvölgyi | Dorothea Gömmel | Oliver Gutsch

Clarinets Johannes Gmeinder | Jens Bischof | Diemut Schneider-Tetzlaff | Julia Hollenberg | Matthias Höfer

Bassoons Karl Ventulett | Heiko Dechert | Richard Morschel | Eberhard Beer | Stephan Köhr

French Horns Sibylle Mahni-Haas | Mahir Kalmik | Fabian Borchers | Casey Rippon | Thomas Bernstein | Silke Schurack | Dirk Delorette | Detlef Holzhauser

Trumpets Wolfgang Basch | David Tasa | Markus Bebek | Wolfgang Guggenberger | Dominik Ring

Trombones Reinhard Nietert | Tim Raschke | Hartmut Friedrich | Manfred Keller | Rainer Hoffmann

Tuba/Cimbasso József Juhász-Aba

Timpani Tobias Kästle | Ulrich Weber

Percussion Jürgen Friedel | Nicole Hartig | Michael Dietz

Harps Françoise Friedrich | Barbara Mayr

Books
 Paul Bartholomäi: Das Frankfurter Museums-Orchester – zwei Jahrhunderte Musik für Frankfurt, Edition Peters, Frankfurt am Main 2002,  (in German)

References

External links
 Homepage of the Oper Frankfurt 
 Frankfurter Museumsgesellschaft 
 Alte Oper Frankfurt 

18th-century establishments in the Holy Roman Empire
German symphony orchestras
Museums in popular culture
Music in Frankfurt
Tourist attractions in Frankfurt